Einar Jónsson (April 19, 1863 – November 5, 1922) was an Icelandic painter. He had the same name as his contemptuary: Einar Jónsson (sculptor), also from south Iceland.

He was born on the farm Foss in Myrdal.

He studied at the Royal Academy in Copenhagen either 1893 or 1894. The subjects of his pictures are mostly the landscapes of his home country.

References

External links
Einar Jónsson frá Fossi - list-mála-meistari; article in Morgunbladid, February 12th 1978 in Icelandic

1863 births
1922 deaths
Landscape artists
19th-century Icelandic painters
19th-century male artists
20th-century Icelandic painters
20th-century male artists
Male painters